The Kapil Sharma Show, also known as TKSS, is an Indian Hindi-language stand-up comedy and talk show broadcast by Sony Entertainment Television. Hosted by Kapil Sharma, the first season of the show had its premiere on 23 April 2016. The series revolved around Sharma and his neighbours in the Shantivan Non Co-operative Housing Society. The filming of the show took place at Film City situated in Goregaon East, Mumbai. The first season of the show was produced by Sharma's banner K9 Productions in association with Frames Productions while the second and third season is being jointly produced by Salman Khan Television and Banijay Asia with K9 Productions and TEAM (Triyambh Entertainment and Media) as the creative producers. The show's fourth season was launched in September 2022 in which Archana Puran Singh reprised her role as the guest judge. As per the reports, the team also saw some new actors joining the star cast.

Premise
The series format is largely identical to that of Sharma's former show Comedy Nights with Kapil. The Kapil Sharma Show revolves around Kapil Sharma and his team of comedians, including Sumona Chakravarti, Kiku Sharda, Chandan Prabhakar, Krushna Abhishek, Bharti Singh and Rochelle Rao, who play residents of the Shantivan Non-cooperative Housing Society. Normally every episode unfolds in two parts with the first part being a comic skit enacted by the actors of the show and the second part being the celebrity interview where popular personalities from various fields indulge in a light-hearted interaction with Kapil Sharma. Navjot Singh Sidhu was the permanent guest of the show but was replaced by Archana Puran Singh after 16 February 2019.

Cast

Season 1

Main
Kapil Sharma as Himself (Host) / Kappu Sharma / Inspector Shamsher Singh / Chappu / Rajesh Arora / Gapu  / Tapu /Khatrughan Sinha (Shatrughan Sinha's mimic)/Navjot Sidhu's mimic
Sunil Grover as Dr. Mashoor Gulati / Rinku Devi /Amitabh Bachchan's mimic / Dharmendra Singh's mimic/ Navjot Sidhu's mimic
Ali Asgar as Nani / Begum Luchi / Amitabh Bachchan's mimic / Mr. Gulati (Mashoor's father)

Kiku Sharda as Bumper Lottery (Nurse in 50-50 Hospital) / Santosh (Rinku's sister-in-law) / Inspector Damodar Ishwarlal Gaitonde / Bachcha Yadhav (Milkman) / Achcha Yadhav (Bachcha's twin brother) / Sunny Deol's mimic
Bharti Singh as Babli Mausi / Lalli
Chandan Prabhakar as Chandu (CEO of Dubai tea stall) / Shah Rukh Khan's mimic
Sumona Chakravarti as Sarla Gulati (Mashoor's daughter; Kappu's childhood friend and Chandu's love interest) 
Navjot Singh Sidhu as Guest

Recurring
Naseem Vicky as Chiku (Twinkle's husband and Film Producer)
Paresh Ganatra as an auto driver and various characters
Rajiv Thakur as a policeman and various characters
Upasana Singh as Twinkle (Kappu's neighbour and old friend of Dr. Mashoor Gulati)
Sanket Bhosale as Baba (Sanjay Dutt's mimic)
Siddharth Sagar as Omerian Khurana (Khajoor's School Principal)
Hussain Dehgamwala as Chunnu Tripathi and various characters
Naveen Bawa as various characters
Vikalp Mehta in a Guest Role
Rochelle Rao as Lottery, a nurse in 50-50 hospital, Kappu's love interest
Atul Parchure as a bodyguard and various characters
Debina Bonnerjee in a Guest role
Sargun Mehta as Sangeeta / Dr. Sudha (Guest role) and various characters
Pooja Gor in a Guest Role
Roshni Chopra in a Guest role
Manju Sharma as Thandai Devi (Chandu's wife and Khajoor's mother)
Monica Castelino in a Guest Role
Raju Shrivastav as Bumper's Chachaji and various characters
 Kartikey Raj as Khajur / Kapil Sharma Junior (Chandu's son)

Season 2

Main
 Kapil Sharma as Himself (Host) / Kappu Sharma (Owner of Sharma Bandhu Salah-Center) / Rajesh Arora / Shatrughan Sinha's mimic / Chappu Sharma / Inspector Shamsher Singh / Navjot Singh Sidhu's mimic
 Kiku Sharda as Bachcha Yadhav (Milkman; father of 11 children) / Achcha Yadhav (Bachcha's twin brother) / Sunny Deol's mimic (Funny Deol) / Dhaniram
 Sumona Chakravarti as Bhoori (Titli's sister; Chandu's love interest) 

 Chandan Prabhakar as Chandu (Advisor at Sharma's Salah Center) / Keerthi Laal / Bimla Devi / Shakal / Chandni (Chandu's mother)
 Krushna Abhishek as Himself / Sapna Laal Sharma (Owner of Sapna Beauty Parlor; Kapil's sister) / Akshay Kumar's, Amitabh Bachchan's, Jackie Shroff's, Sanjay Dutt's, Archana Puran Singh's,  Jeetendra's,Dharmendra's mimic (Dharam Singh Nakli) / Ramlal / Mitti Mouse (a spoof of Mickey Mouse)
 Bharti Singh as Titli Yadav (Bachcha's wife; mother of 11 children) / Guddu (Bachcha and Titli's eldest son) / Kammo Bhua (Kappu's aunt) / Archana Puran Singh's mimic
 Rochelle Rao as Chingaari (Robert's sister) 
 Edward Sonnenblick as Robert Paswan (Chingaari's brother)
Navjot Singh Sidhu as Previous Permanent Guest 
Archana Puran Singh as Permanent Guest (current)
Harbhajan Singh in a guest appearance for two episodes
Rajiv Thakur as Thakur and various characters
Karishma Sharma as various characters
Falaq Naaz as Gorgeous Girl 
Parvati Sehgal as various characters 
Puja Banerjee as Gorgeous Customer
Surabhi Mehra and Samriddhi Mehra as Chinki and Minki (twin sisters)
Divyansh Dwivedi as Kachcha Yadhav (Bachcha and Titli's son)

Season 3

Main
 Kapil Sharma as Himself (Host) / Kappu Sharma / Rajesh Arora / Shatrughan Sinha's mimic / Chappu Sharma / Inspector Shamsher Singh / Navjot Singh Sidhu's mimic / Daler Mehndi's mimic (Aareh Mehandi) / Chedulal Ji
 Kiku Sharda as Sunny Deol's mimic (Funny Deol) / Dhaniram / Annu Kapoor's mimic (Manu Kapoor) / Advocate Mr. Damodar / Achcha Yadhav 
 Sudesh Lehri as Chacha (Kappu's uncle) / Mika Singh's mimic (Chicken Tikka Singh)
 Bharti Singh as Herself / Chachi (Chacha's wife)
 Sumona Chakravarti as Bhoori (Owner of Hotel Chill Palace)
 Chandan Prabhakar as Chandu (Owner of 10 Star General Store) / Keerthi Laal / Bimla Devi / Shakal / Chandni (Chandu's mother)
 Krushna Abhishek as Himself / Sapna Laal Sharma (Owner of Sapna Beauty Parlor; Kappu's sister) / Akshay Kumar's, Amitabh Bachchan's, Jackie Shroff's, Sanjay Dutt's, Dharmendra's (Dharam Singh Nakli) /  Archana Puran Singh's, Jeetendra's, Bappi Lahiri's mimic (Jhappi Lahiri) / Lalit, Mitti Mouse (a spoof of Mickey Mouse) / Ramlal
 Archana Puran Singh as Permanent Guest
 Rajiv Thakur as Thakur and various characters
 Rochelle Rao as Mr. Damodar's assistant
 Jamie Lever as Various characters

Season 4

Main
 Kapil Sharma as Kappu Sharma / Himself (Host)
 Kiku Sharda as Gudiya Laundrywali / Badshah Akbar
 Archana Puran Singh as Permanent Guest 
 Sumona Chakravarti as Bindu
 Siddharth Sagar as Ustaad Gharchordas / Funveer Singh (Ranveer Singh's mimic) / Sagar Pagletu
 Srishty Rode as Ghazal
 Gaurav Dubey as various characters 
 Vikalp Mehta as Rakshay Kumar (Akshay Kumar's mimic)
 Rajeev Thakur as Raju
 Rehman Khan as Salim
 Ishtiyak Khan as Kapil’s Father in law
 Ketan Singh as Churan / Pankaj Tripathi mimic
 Srikant Maski as Maski
 Chandan Prabhakar as Chandu
 Jayvijay Sachan as Various characters
 Atul Parchure as Kapil’s Father in law

Series overview

Season 1 (2016-2017)

Season 2 (2018-2021)

Season 3 (2021-2022)

Season 4 (2022-present)

Controversy 
On 31 August 2017, the spokesperson of Sony Entertainment Television announced that Kapil Sharma and the channel have mutually agreed to give the show a short break as the shooting of several episodes had to be cancelled in the past few days due to Sharma's poor health. The show started losing TRP post Sharma's mid-air altercation with co-star Sunil Grover. After that, his health started deteriorating which made him skip the show for a couple of episodes. After the controversy, Grover left the show along with Chandan Prabhakar, Ali Asgar and some other cast members. Prabhakar returned to the show along with Bharti Singh appearing in recurring episodes. The show went off air in 2017. The second season took to the telecast in December 2018.  Singh and Krushna Abhishek joined the show as new cast.

The show was also in controversy when film director Vivek Agnihotri said that the star cast of his movie The Kashmir Files was not invited to the show because the film does not have a commercial star cast.

Later, film actor Anupam Kher denied allegations of Vivek Agnihotri.

Reception 
The Kapil Sharma Show'''s first season received a mixed reception from critics and audiences. Namrata Thakker of Rediff.com gave it 2.5 stars out of 5 stars, liking the characters of Sunil Grover and Ali Asgar but saying that "the series has big shoes to fill considering how successful their earlier show Comedy Nights With Kapil was." Chaya Unnikrishnan of Daily News and Analysis gave the series two stars out of five but said, "Kapil Sharma's wit and funny one-liners bring a laugh". Although she praised part of the show ("In fact, the 10 minutes or so where [Sharma] has a monologue is the best part of the show"), Unnikrishnan called it "dull and disappointing". In her 1.5-star review, Letty Mariam Abraham of Mid-Day said: "The whole look and feel of the new set is interesting, even if the jokes are old". However, "Kapil brings nothing new to the plate and it seems like a waste of the prime time slot." The season 2 of the show got a favourable opening according Broadcast Audience Research Council ratings, with 8.1 million impressions.

 Viewer response 
According to the reports published by the Broadcast Audience Research Council, the show's first episode of the show generated 8,943 responses. Although some viewers were happy to see the same contestants back after watching Comedy Nights with Kapil, others were disappointed with the show's repetitive humour and chaos. The series' 16th episode, featuring the Sairat team and airing on 12 June 2016, had good ratings show in the non-fiction category.

 Awards 

See also

Similar shows
 Raju Vootla Party''

Notes

References

Indian television sketch shows
2016 Indian television series debuts
Hindi-language television shows
Indian stand-up comedy television series
Sony Entertainment Television original programming
Frames Production series